Coos Bay is a bay on the coast of Oregon in the United States.

Coos Bay may also refer to:
 Coos Bay, Oregon, a city in Oregon
 Port of Coos Bay
 Coos Bay Rail Link
 , a United States Navy seaplane tender in commission from 1943 to 1946
 , later WHEC-376, a United States Coast Guard cutter in commission from 1949 to 1966

See also
 Coos (disambiguation)